Lake Natoma is a small lake in the western United States, along the lower American River, between Folsom and Nimbus Dams in Sacramento County, California. The lake is located within the Folsom Lake State Recreation Area which is responsible for maintaining the facilities and bike trails surrounding the lake. Lake Natoma is located 15 miles east of Sacramento, and has 500 surface acres of water.  The total length of lake Natoma is 4 miles.

Lake Natoma is a recreational lake for rowing, kayaking, and swimming; powerboats are permitted with a  "no wake" restriction. It is home to the Sacramento State Aquatic Center, and regularly hosts West Coast College Rowing Championships, the Pac-12 Conference rowing championships, and, every four years, the Intercollegiate Rowing Association Championships. The Lake Natoma Four Bridges Half Marathon is held each October at the lake.

Lake Natoma includes the historic Black Miners Bar area in Folsom, the site of a gold rush era African-American mining camp.

The Folsom Powerhouse State Historic Park overlooks Lake Natoma in the city of Folsom. It is a California State Historical site, preserving an early hydroelectric power station.

A paved cycling and jogging trail encircles the lake along with unpaved equestrian trails. The Folsom South Canal Trail also begins at the lake. Several parking lots and boat launching ramps are located around the lake.

History 

In the 1950s, after the Folsom Dam was constructed as part of the Central Valley project work began on Nimbus Dam which would create Lake Natoma. Lake Natoma was built to manage water released from Folsom Dam. Lake Natoma is a reservoir that was built in conjunction with the Folsom Dam and Folsom reservoir by the Central Valley Project Authority. In addition to maintaining water flow the lake provides water to irrigation canals and generates hydro electric power[4]. After Lake Natoma and Folsom Lake were built, the Bureau of Reclamation was given control of operation for both reservoirs and dams.

Mining History 
Before Natoma reservoir was created the section of the American river it now occupies was the site of many gold mining operations in the 1800s.

Around 1956, the Bureau of Reclamation and California Department of Parks and Recreation, also known as State Parks, formed an agreement that State Parks will be responsible for recreational activities on Lake Natoma, as well as Folsom Lake.

Recreation History 
In 1979, the general plan for the State Recreational Area at Folsom Lake, including Lake Natoma, was amended three times before it was approved. As part of the 1979 General Plan amendment, the Folsom Powerhouse State Historic Park became a separate unit, not a part of the Folsom Unit.

In 2002, multiple meetings were held for public input and for interested stakeholder to plan and prepare for recreational purposes adequate enough for the growing populations. There was a 62% increase in population since the General Plan was accepted in 1979.

Folsom Powerhouse State Historic Park 

Folsom Powerhouse

On the south bank of Lake Natoma lies the old Folsom Powerhouse State Historic Park, located in the City of Folsom at the intersection of Riley and Scott Streets. In 1895, Folsom Powerhouse became the first powerhouse to generate electricity for the city of Sacramento.[clarification needed] The facility, which included the powerhouse and a dam, operated until 1952 when construction of the modern Folsom Dam hydroelectric facility was completed. The new Folsom Dam rendered the old Folsom Powerhouse obsolete. The old dam that had been used in conjunction with the historic Folsom Powerhouse was removed during construction of the modern Folsom Dam facility.[clarification needed] During its operation (1895-1952) the powerhouse delivered 11,000 volts of electricity over 22 miles to Sacramento. The historic site is listed in the National Register of Historic Places. There is a visitor center where the public can learn more about the history of the park.

Physical features 
Surrounding this narrow lake are foothills, plateaus, cliffs and river canyons.  A dense  riparian ecosystem encircles the lake. The Lake Natoma Bluffs stand  and line the lake from the Negro Bar to the Mississippi Bar.

Recreational activities 
People come to this area for many activities, especially in the summer. The area is accessible via US Highway 50. Since these reservoirs are located in the metropolitan area, the State Recreational Area (SRA) tries to create a habitat suitable for the wildlife that are already living there, to have both "recreation and nature." In 2000, there were over 1.5 million visitors to Folsom Lake State Recreation Area, including Lake Natoma and Folsom Lake.

Water and land uses 
Lake Natoma was first ready for the public in 1958. The common water activities are kayaking, rowing, canoeing, swimming, water skiing, sailing, and fishing. Land activities include hiking, biking, picnicking, jogging, and horseback riding. Educational activities are also available, including information about historical sites near Lake Natoma and Folsom Lake. Like the  common fish that spawn in the American River, the history of the California Gold Rush, and Native American life before the Europeans' arrival.

Major facilities

Boat launch 
The lake has three boat launches for powerboats, jetskis, and sailboats. These launches are well designed with two hard surface launches and one gravel launch. With enough room to turn around, and parking areas.  Fishermen like to use the Negro Bar launch, as many fishing tournament events occur nearby. California State University Sacramento (CSUS) holds rowing classes here.

Campgrounds 
There is only one campground open to the public on lake Natoma: Black Miner's Bar Group Campground.

Willow Creek 
Located at the Willow Creek inlet to Lake Natoma, this area is used for both land and water activities. The area is used for picnicking, birdwatching, fishing, and canoeing. Lake Natoma Trail is nearby.

Aquatic Center for CSUS 

Where the Nimbus Dam ends, there is an Aquatic Center right on Lake Natoma that belongs to the California State University Sacramento (CSUS). This is where CSUS holds some of their aquatic classes, such as skiing and wind surfing.

Bike path 
A bike path follows along the East Trail and West Trail of Nimbus Dam that lines Lake Natoma.

Dirt trails 
Six miles of dirt trail lead to Nimbus Flat and Willow Creek. There are also dirt trails on both sides of Lake Natoma; one is six miles and other is nine miles.

Nimbus Fish Hatchery 

Under Nimbus Dam and Lake Natoma lies the Nimbus Fish Hatchery, operated by the California Department of Fish and Games, that was built in 1955 by the U.S Bureau of Reclamation. The California Department of Fish and Games operates a visitor center here. The hatchery replicates spawning environments by creating a fish ladder that guides salmon and steelheads to spawn. For recreational fishing in the northern and Central California bodies of water, the hatchery produces 4 million Chinook salmon and over 400,000 Steelhead trout per year.

Animals 
Native animals known to lie here are the mule deer, coyote, bobcat, mountain lion, quail, bald and golden eagle, heron, egret, western pond turtle, and California horned lizard. A few common fish in Lake Natoma are catfish and carp. Aquatic animals in Lake Natoma are usually tolerant of warm water and low oxygen level water. Other fish found here are bass, bluegill, and green sunfish. Right under Nimbus Dam are steelheads, Chinook salmon, American shad, and Pacific lampreys. Bald eagles and golden eagles can be found around Folsom Lake and Lake Natoma for nesting; about six bald eagles and two golden eagles are observed annually. Both are protected under the Federal Bald Eagle Protection Act of 1940.

Environmental issues

Mercury 
Fish at Lake Natoma were found to have high levels of mercury in their tissue. A sample of 22 fish showed that mercury levels had approached or exceed guidelines set by the U.S. Environmental Protection Agency, which is set at 3 microgram Hg/g wet weight. Since there were too few samples, it is not known for sure if mercury is randomly distributed throughout Lake Natoma. Concentration of mercury increases as sizes of fish increase, usually because of bioaccumulation. Factors include length, weight, and age. For example, predators at the top of the food chain, such as large bass mouth, spotted bass, and white catfish, usually have higher concentrations.

The California Office of Environmental Health Hazard Assessment (OEHHA) has developed a safe eating advisory for Lake Natoma, based on levels of mercury found in fish caught here.

See also 
 List of dams and reservoirs in California
 List of lakes in California

External links 
 Nimbus Dam fact sheet - United States Bureau of Reclamation

References
Saiki, M.K. (2004). Summary of total mercury concentrations in fillets of selected sport fishes collected during 2000-2003 from Lake Natoma, Sacramento County, California [Data Series 103]. Reston, VA: U.S. Department of the Interior, U.S. Geological Survey.

Natoma
Natoma
American River (California)
Central Valley Project
Parks in the San Joaquin Valley
Rowing venues in the United States
Natoma